The Winton Manor is a high-rise former grand hotel that has been converted to a senior living apartment building on Prospect Avenue in the Cleveland Theater District in downtown Cleveland. The building was opened in 1916 as the Hotel Winton.

The Design
The Winton was designed by Nelson Max Dunning of Chicago.

Closing and reopening
In 1931, the name was changed to the Carter Hotel and operated until the 1960s, having to close after a major fire. The building is now a low-income housing property for senior citizens. This is partly due to its placement next to a major public transportation route.

See also
 Chicago School (architecture)

References

Residential skyscrapers in Cleveland
Buildings and structures in Cleveland
Apartment buildings in Cleveland
Chicago school architecture in Ohio